Welt is a punk rock band formed in Sacramento, California in 1993 by Jason Cooper, who has been the only constant member.

History
Welt signed to the Dr. Dream label, releasing the "Lame" single in 1994. The band's debut album, Better Days, was released in 1995. Kicked in the Teeth Again (1996) was seen as a progression. The band relocated to Orange County in 1998, releasing third album Broke Down the same year.

The band underwent several lineup changes prior to the late 1990s. Since then the band has been more stable, with Cooper joined by guitarists Tobe Bean and Todd Harper and drummer Marc Harrismendy. In 2000 the band signed with B.Y.O. Records.

Two of the band's tracks ("Get Lost" and "Broken") were used in the soundtrack of the film 21 (2000), and "The World is Mine" was used in the 2002 film The Skulls II.

In 2009, Cooper released the album The Shop Tapes under the name Jason Welt.

Discography

Albums
Better Days (1995), Dr. Dream
Kicked in the Teeth Again (1996), Dr. Dream
Broke Down (1998), Dr. Dream
Brand New Dream (2001), Golf
Ashes to Ashes (2005), Cider City

Jason Welt
The Shop Tapes (2009), Cider City

Singles
"Lame" (1994), Dr. Dream

References

Musical groups established in 1993
Punk rock groups from California
Musical groups from Sacramento, California